Lecidea tessellata is a species of saxicolous (rock-dwelling), crustose lichen in the family Lecideaceae. It was formally described as a species in 1819 by German botanist Heinrich Flörke. In northern North America, it is common and widely distributed, growing on non-calcareous rocks. It also occurs in Afghanistan, China, Nepal, Europe, and Russian Asia. Its southern distribution extends to James Ross Island, where it is locally common.

Description

Lecidea tessellata has a chalky white to grey, cracked and areolate thallus. Its apothecia are black, subimmersed, appressed to adnate and range from 0.5 to 1.8 (–2.0) mm in diameter. The apothecial  is smooth, initially rounded in young apothecia, but becomes convex and irregular in mature ones, sometimes with a thin white pruinose layer. The  are clavate and measure 30–50 by 8–14 μm, and the ascospores are ellipsoid and measure 7–9 by 5–6 μm. Lecidea tessellata contains confluentic acid, a lichen product that can be detected using thin-layer chromatography. Both the thallus and medulla of the lichen have negative reactions with standard chemical spot tests (K–, C–, PD–).

Lecidea oreophila, found in the mountains of California's Sierra Nevada, is similar in appearance to L. tessellata, but it has a dark hypothecium and produces 2′-O-methylmicrophyllinic acid as the primary lichen product, with or without accessory confluentic acid.

See also
List of Lecidea species

References

Lecideales
Lichen species
Lichens described in 1819
Taxa named by Heinrich Gustav Flörke
Lichens of China
Lichens of Europe
Lichens of India
Lichens of Western Asia
Lichens of North America